Hulkkonen is a Finnish surname. Notable people with the surname include:

Heikki Hulkkonen (born 1955), Finnish modern pentathlete and fencer
Jori Hulkkonen (born 1973), Finnish musician and DJ
Pasi Hulkkonen (born 1961), Finnish modern pentathlete

Finnish-language surnames